The US Open was a United States darts tournament, organised by the Professional Darts Corporation (PDC), which launched in May 2007. It replaced the World Series of Darts which ran for one year and was cancelled as a result of poor television ratings on ESPN.

In 2007 and 2008 the tournament was held at the Mohegan Sun Casino Resort in Connecticut – which was also the venue used for the World Series of Darts. The tournament moved to Atlanta, Georgia for the 2009 event. In 2009 and 2010 the event became Players Championship events as part of the PDC Pro Tour.

Phil Taylor won the first two events, but opted not to take part in the 2009 version which Dennis Priestley won.  Taylor came back in 2010 and beat Denis Ovens in the final.

Television coverage

The 2007 tournament was broadcast live in the UK on satellite station Challenge, who were broadcasting a PDC tournament for the first time. Limited coverage of the event was shown on US sport channel Versus. In 2008 coverage passed to Nuts TV in the UK.

Format

The US Open was a PDC Major event in 2007 and 2008 . It became a PDC Pro Tour event in 2009 and 2010 for the last two editions of the event.

Results

Notes

References

External links
 US Open page on the PDC website
Results at dartsdatabase.co.uk

 
2007 establishments in the United States
2010 establishments in the United States
Professional Darts Corporation tournaments